The New Zealand falcon ( or kāiaia; Falco novaeseelandiae) is New Zealand's only falcon. Other common names for the bird are Bush Hawk and Sparrow Hawk. It is frequently mistaken for the larger and more common swamp harrier. It is the country's most threatened bird of prey, with only around 3000–5000 breeding pairs remaining.

Taxonomy
The New Zealand falcon was formally described in 1788 by the German naturalist Johann Friedrich Gmelin in his revised and expanded edition of Carl Linnaeus's Systema Naturae. He placed it with the falcons and eagles in the genus Falco and coined the binomial name Falco novaeseelandiae. Gmelin based his description on the "New-Zealand falcon" that had been described and illustrated in 1781 by the English ornithologist John Latham. Latham had examined specimens both in the British Museum and in the Leverian Museum.

Ornithologists variously described the New Zealand falcon as an aberrant hobby or as allied to three South American species – F. deiroleucus (orange-breasted falcon), F. rufigularis (bat falcon), and F. femoralis (aplomado falcon); molecular phylogenetic studies show that it is most closely related to the aplomado falcon. Two forms are apparent from their significantly different sizes, with the larger race in the South Island and the smaller in the North Island. Although neutral genetic markers show a recent history of these two forms, the substantial size difference is likely to be driven by ecological adaptation. Conservation management had already avoided mixing of the North Island (Falco novaeseelandiae ferox) and South Island (Falco novaeseelandiae novaeseelandiae) populations.

Description
(Unlike the swamp harrier, the New Zealand falcon catches other birds in flight, and rarely eats carrion.) The male is about two-thirds the weight of the female.

Distribution and habitat
The New Zealand falcon is mainly found in heavy bush and the steep high country in the South Island, and is rarely seen north of a line through the central area of the North Island. A small population also breeds on the Auckland Islands; the species is known from the Chatham Islands from fossil remains.

Behaviour
An aggressive bird that displays great violence when defending its territory, the New Zealand falcon has been reported to attack dogs, as well as people.

Breeding
The New Zealand falcon nests in a scrape in grassy soil or humus in various locations: under a rock on a steep slope or on a rock ledge, among epiphytic plants on a tree branch, or under a log or branch on the ground, or on bare ground, making the two or three eggs that they lay vulnerable to predators such as stray cats, stoats, weasels, possums, and wild dogs.

Food and feeding 
In common with other falcons, the prey of the New Zealand falcon is mostly other birds, such as pigeons, parakeets, seabirds and pheasants. However, it is opportunistic and will also take stoats, hares and rabbits.  It also preys upon insects, including cicadas, beetles and dragonflies. It will sometimes feed on carrion.

Relationship with humans

Falconry 
The Wingspan National Bird of Prey Centre in the Ngongotahā Valley is a captive breeding facility and visitor centre. Wingspan undertakes conservation, education and research activities related to birds of prey found in New Zealand, and provides demonstrations of falconry.

Falcons for Grapes programme
In 2005, funding was given by the Ministry of Agriculture and Forestry towards a programme that uses the falcons to control birds that damage grapes and act as pests in vineyards as well as monitoring the birds and establishing a breeding population in the vicinity of the Marlborough wine region. Initially, four falcons were relocated to the vineyards from the surrounding hills. After the release of a further 15 birds breeding began to occur – the first time it is thought to have happened since land clearance 150 years ago.

Cardrona Kārearea Conservation Project 
The Cardrona Valley in the South Island has a small population of kārearea. The five-year project that started in 2019 will focus on collecting data on the kārearea to gather knowledge of sightings, locate breeding pairs, locate and monitor nests, and gain insights on breeding population, habitat use, and territory size.

Illegal shooting
New Zealand falcon are fully protected under the Wildlife Act 1953.  However, there are many reported instances of falcons being illegally shot. The founder of Wingspan, Debbie Stewart, says: “Most of the birds we get in here have been shot. It’s criminal.” She has also said that human activities lead to the deaths of three-quarters of falcons in their first year. Both Stewart and the Department of Conservation have claimed that people shooting New Zealand falcons have interests in chickens or racing pigeons.

Electrocution threat 

Another ongoing threat to the birds from human activity is electrocution. Both a five-year radio tracking study of released birds in Marlborough and an observational study in Glenorchy have attributed nearly half of the bird deaths to electrocution on 11,000 volt distribution transformers and structures.

Cultural references
The New Zealand falcon features on the reverse of the New Zealand $20 note and has twice been used on New Zealand stamps. It was also featured on a collectable $5 coin in 2006.

The Royal New Zealand Air Force's aerobatic team is called the Black Falcons.

The proverb "Me te kopae kārearea" or "like the nest of kārearea" means 'rarely seen.'

The kārearea was voted Bird of the Year winner in 2012. The Forest & Bird competition aims to raise awareness about New Zealand's native birds, their habitats, and the threats they face.

Gallery

See also
Wingspan National Bird of Prey Centre

References

Cited sources

Further reading

External links

Wingspan Birds of Prey Trust - The national centre for the conservation, education and advocacy of birds of prey in New Zealand. Location: Rotorua, NZ.
Raptor Association of New Zealand
New Zealand Falcon New Zealand Birds Online 
New Zealand falcon/Kārearea at Department of Conservation (New Zealand)
New Zealand Falcon at Birdlife International
New Zealand falcon at Te Ara: The Encyclopedia of New Zealand
Assessment of the potential for the integration of New Zealand falcon conservation and vineyard pest management 
Marlborough Falcon Conservation Trust
Raptor Alliance for New Zealand
New Zealand falcon discussed on RNZ Critter of the Week, 1 June 2018

New Zealand falcon
New Zealand falcon
New Zealand falcon
New Zealand falcon